GFK Kumanovo is a football club from Kumanovo, North Macedonia. They are currently competing in the Macedonian Third League (North Division).

History

The club was founded in 1924 and in the 1970–71 season won the Republic League. Since the independence, the club was in the Second League until the 1999–00 season when debuted in the top flight. That season was immediately relegated and after one season in the second division won promotion again, this time lasting for two consecutive seasons. Kumanovo has spent a total of 3 seasons in the 1. MFL and has won the 2. MFL on two occasions. In 2003–04 got relegated into the 3. MFL North and in the 2006–07 season quit participating on half-season. After two seasons the club was reactivated in the local fourth divisional group, but only for two seasons. In 2012–13 a new subject called Kumanovo 2006 emerged, but never managed to get pass the Fourth League and after 5 seasons seized to exist.

Kumanovo was reactivated in January 2023 as a result of merger of the clubs Studena Voda from nearby Dobroshane, Kumanovo 2012 and a youth academy Eurosport-Vardar to form GFK Kumanovo.

Technical staff

Former Chairmans
  Novica Damjanovski
  Dragan Daravelski

Historical list of coaches

  Nikola Ilievski (1990 - 1991)
  Pavle Georgievski
  Erkan Jusuf (1999)
  Miroslav Jakovljević (2000)
  Vlatko Kostov (2000 - 2002)
  Alekso Mackov (2002)
  Dragi Kanatlarovski (2002)
  Vančo Spasovski (2003)

Players

Former players
  Pavle Georgievski
  Vujadin Stanojković (1985)
  Gorazd Mihajlov
  Boban Nikolovski (1993-1995)
  Vlade Lazarevski (2000-2001)
  Esad Cholakovikj (2002-2003)

Honours
 Macedonian Republic League:
Winners (2): 1949,1971

 Macedonian Second League:
Winners (2): 1998–99, 2000–01
Runners-up (2): 1994–95, 1997–98

References

External links
Club info at MacedonianFootball 
Supporters Website 
Football Federation of Macedonia 

 
Kumanovo
Association football clubs established in 1924
1924 establishments in Yugoslavia